Grundel is a surname. Notable people with the surname include:

Anton Grundel (born 1990), Swedish ice hockey player
Heinz Gründel (born 1957), German footballer
Kalle Grundel (born 1948), Swedish rally driver

See also
Simon Grundel-Helmfelt (1617–1677), Swedish military officer and governor